Juan Diego Rojas Caicedo (born 23 December 1992) is an Ecuadorian footballer who plays as a midfielder, winger, or attacker for Delfín.

Career

Before the 2019 season, Rojas signed for Delfín in Ecuador, helping them win their only top flight title. On 22 January 2019, he earned comparisons to Brazilian international Neymar after doing backwards stepovers over the ball while it was rolling backwards during a 3-0 win over Paraguayan side Nacional (Asunción).

References

External links
 

Ecuadorian footballers
Association football wingers
Association football forwards
Living people
1992 births
Ecuadorian Serie A players
C.S.D. Independiente del Valle footballers
S.D. Quito footballers
C.D. Cuenca footballers
Guayaquil City F.C. footballers
Delfín S.C. footballers
Association football midfielders
People from San Lorenzo Canton